The Harvard Graduate School of Education (HGSE) is the education school of Harvard University, a private research university in Cambridge, Massachusetts. Founded in 1920, it was the first school to grant the EdD degree and the first Harvard school to award degrees to women. HGSE enrolls more than 800 students in its one-year master of education (Ed.M.) and three-year doctor of education leadership (Ed.L.D.) programs.

The Harvard Graduate School of Education is currently ranked as the #2 education school in the nation by U.S. News & World Report.

It is associated with the Harvard Education Publishing Group whose imprint is the Harvard Education Press and publishes the Harvard Educational Review.

History 
This school was established in 1920. 29 years prior to its establishment, Harvard President Charles W. Eliot appointed Paul Henry Hanus to begin the formal study of education as a discipline at Harvard. However, at that time the focus was not on establishing education as an academic discipline at Harvard. Instead, the concern was on proper college preparation for students attending secondary education in public schools. As a result, education became a formal division within the Faculty of Arts and Sciences in 1906 before the rebirth of the division into a separate Harvard faculty in 1920.

In the next year, HGSE became the first school to grant a doctor of education (Ed.D.) degree which provided rigorous research training that equipped graduates with the knowledge and skills to have a broad impact in the worlds of policy and practice. The faculty has grown ever since. In 1949, the Laboratory of Human Development (now the Human Development and Psychology Program) was established to examine the psychological development of children in their families and communities. Two years later, the Masters of Arts in Teaching degree was offered by HGSE, followed by the Administrative Career Program. 

The school is by Dean Bridget Terry Long,

Project Zero 
Nelson Goodman founded Project Zero in 1967 to explore a basic research project in artistic cognition and artistic education. This project developed into a bigger scope ever since included being directed by Howard Gardner. Numerous research findings are converted into practice through modules, from thinking routines to learning rubrics that can be freely accessed.

Usable Knowledge 
Originally developed by faculty members Kurt Fischer and Joe Blatt, the aim of Usable Knowledge is to be a resource for educators who hope to put HGSE research learnings into practice.

Academics 
HGSE offers a master of education degree (EdM) with five programs and two doctoral degree programs, a doctor of philosophy in education (PhD) and a doctor of education leadership (EdLD). (The PhD program replaced the EdD program, which enrolled its final cohort of students in fall 2013.)  In addition, in 2022, the school launched an online, two-year, part-time master's degree in education leadership.

Master's in Education 
HGSE offers five full-time, one-year, on-campus master's programs:
 Education Leadership, Organizations, and Entrepreneurship
 Education Policy and Analysis
 Human Development and Education
 Learning Design, Innovation, and Technology
 Teaching and Teacher Leadership

Students in the master's degree programs can also declare optional concentrations and pursue teacher, principal, or superintendent licensure pathways.

Buildings 

HGSE took possession of Longfellow Hall from Radcliffe College in 1962. The learning activities, along with the library and office were moved to Longfellow's basement. Larsen Hall was dedicated in 1963, completed in 1965, operating as the new classroom and research center of HGSE.

The Monroe C. Gutman Library is the school's primary library and one of its four main buildings.

Notable people

Current faculty members 
 Catherine E. Snow, Patricia Albjerg Graham Professor of Education
 Felipe Barrera-Osorio, Associate Professor of Education and Economics
 Fernando Reimers, Ford Foundation Professor of the Practice
 Howard Gardner, John H. and Elisabeth A. Hobbs Professor of Cognition and Education
 Jerome Murphy, Harold Howe II Professor of Education
 John B. Willett, Charles William Eliot Professor of Education
 Julie Reuben, Professor of Education
 Richard Murnane, Juliana W. and William Foss Thompson Professor of Education and Society
 Richard Weissbourd, Senior Lecturer of Education
 Thomas Kane, Professor of Education

Past faculty members 
 Carol Gilligan
 Patricia Graham, professor of education
 Robert Kegan William and Miriam Meehan Professor in Adult Learning and Professional Development
 Lawrence Kohlberg
 Sara Lawrence-Lightfoot, Emily Hargroves Fisher Professor of Education, renamed to the Sarah Lawrence-Lightfoot Professor of Education since her retirement
 Gerald S. Lesser, psychologist who played a major role in developing the educational programming included in Sesame Street.
 Kathleen McCartney, former dean; Gerald S. Lesser Professor in Early Childhood Education; current president of Smith College
 James E. Ryan, former dean; Charles William Eliot Professor of Education; current president of the University of Virginia
 Israel Scheffler
 Charles V. Willie, Charles William Eliot Professor of Education, Emeritus

Alumni 
 Andrew McCollum, co-founder of Facebook; angel investor
 James McGreevey, former New Jersey state governor
 Martha Minow, dean, Harvard Law School
Dianne Morales (born 1967), non-profit executive and political candidate
 Anne Sweeney, president, Disney-ABC Television Group
 Carl Gershman, president of the National Endowment for Democracy
 Deborah Bial, founder and president of the Posse Foundation
 Denise Juneau, superintendent of Seattle Public Schools; former Montana Superintendent of Public Instruction
 Elizabeth Dole, former United States Senator from North Carolina and wife of Bob Dole
 Geoffrey Canada, founder, Harlem Children's Zone
 Guadalupe Guerrero, superintendent of Portland Public Schools
 Jason Kamras, 2005 National Teacher of the Year and superintendent of Richmond Public Schools
 Joanne V. Creighton, former president of Mount Holyoke College
 Jodi Picoult, American author
 Joseph Lekuton, Kenyan politician
 Lorna Hodgkinson, Australian educator; first woman to receive an Ed.D. from HGSE
 Michael Johnston, Colorado state senator, co-founder of New Leaders for New Schools
 Neal Baer, executive producer, Law and Order: SVU; former executive producer and writer, ER
 Nínive Clements Calegari, CEO of 826 National and founding executive director of 826 Valencia
 Robyn Ochs, bisexual and LGBT rights activist, speaker
 Rhea Paul, speech and language disorder researcher
 Timothy Lannon, president of Creighton University
 Theodore R. Sizer, dean, Harvard Graduate School of Education (1964-1972); headmaster, Phillips Andover Academy (1972-1981); founder of the Coalition of Essential Schools, Annenberg Institute for School Reform at Brown University, and Francis W. Parker Charter Essential School; author of numerous books on public education reform
 Clint Smith, writer and educator
 Sandra Sucher, business executive; professor, Harvard Business School
William E. Trueheart, president of Bryant University, nonprofit CEO
 Joan Wexler, dean and president of Brooklyn Law School
 Peggy R. Williams, former president of Ithaca College
 Frank H. Wu, president of Queens College, City University of New York
 Zahia Marzouk, an Egyptian social worker and feminist who founded Egypt's first family planning association
 Ronald F. Levant, a psychologist and professor who co-founded the field of the psychology of men and masculinities

References

External links
 Official Web Site
 Harvard Education Publishing Group

1920 establishments in Massachusetts
Educational institutions established in 1920
Education
Schools of education in Massachusetts
Universities and colleges in Cambridge, Massachusetts
University subdivisions in Massachusetts